Eike Duarte Oliveira (born February 17, 1997), better known as Eike Duarte, is a Brazilian actor who became known for his participation as a child in the programs of presenter Xuxa Meneghel and comedian Renato Aragão. In 2017, the actor played his first villain, the character Marcelo Mahla, in the series Juacas, on Disney Channel.

Duarte debuted in 2004 on the program Xuxa no Mundo da Imaginação and until 2016 participated in the fixed cast of Rede Globo and joined the cast of soap operas such as Em Família in 2014 and Sol Nascente in 2016.

In his personal life, Eike dated fellow actress Giulia Costa from 2012 to 2015 and since then he has not taken on another serious relationship.

Filmography

Television

TV presenter/reporter

Film

Video/DVD

References

External links 
 

1997 births
Living people
21st-century Brazilian male actors
Male actors from Rio de Janeiro (city)
Brazilian male child actors
Brazilian male television actors
Brazilian male film actors